Dar Salah is a Palestinian village located  east of Bethlehem. The village is in the Bethlehem Governorate Southern West Bank. According to the Palestinian Central Bureau of Statistics, the village had a population of 3,373 in 2007.

As of February 2015, Dar Salah had the only ostrich farm in the Palestinian territories, a unique project by a local farmer.

Footnotes

External links
Welcome To Dar Salah
Survey of Western Palestine, Map 17:    IAA, Wikimedia commons
Dar Salah Village (fact sheet), Applied Research Institute–Jerusalem, ARIJ
Dar Salah Village profile, ARIJ
Dar Salah  aerial photo, ARIJ
 The priorities and needs for development in Dar Salah village based on the community and local authorities’ assessment, ARIJ

Villages in the West Bank
Bethlehem Governorate
Municipalities of the State of Palestine